Charles C. Riley (May 13, 1902 – July 19, 1971) was an American football player and coach. He was born in Indianapolis, Indiana.

Riley was the starting quarterback and punt returner for most of the 1927 season at the University of Notre Dame.  He is mostly remembered for his last game with the team—a controversial 7–6 victory against USC at Soldier Field in Chicago before the largest crowd ever to witness a football game at that time, estimated to be 120,000 in attendance.

While clinging to the one-point lead late in the game, Riley fielded a USC punt at his own goal line and appeared to fumble it out of the end zone, which would have given the Trojans a safety and an 8–7 lead.  But the play was ruled a muff, and therefore a touchback.  Notre Dame would hang on for the win.

In 1930, Riley was hired by fellow Notre Dame alum Tom Lieb to be his assistant football coach at Loyola University of Los Angeles.  One year later, Riley became the head football coach for the University of New Mexico and remained there for three years, posting a record of 7–13–3. He died on July 19, 1971.

Head coaching record

References

 Schoor, Gene. 100 Years of Notre Dame Football. New York: Morrow and Co. (1987).  p. 56–58

1902 births
1971 deaths
American football quarterbacks
Loyola Lions football coaches
New Mexico Lobos football coaches
Notre Dame Fighting Irish football players
Players of American football from Indianapolis